Zubovskia banatica is a species of insect in family Acrididae. It is found in Hungary and Romania.

Sources

Acrididae
Taxonomy articles created by Polbot
Taxobox binomials not recognized by IUCN